Lucas Ceballos may refer to:

 Lucas Ceballos (footballer, born 1987), currently playing for Club Atlético Colón
 Lucas Ceballos (footballer, born 1988), most recently played for Defensores Unidos
 Lucas Ceballos (footballer, born 1990), currently playing for Andino Sport Club